CVL-354 is an opioid antagonist which is under development for the treatment of major depressive disorder and substance-related disorders (e.g., opioid use disorder). It acts as a selective antagonist of the κ-opioid receptor. The drug is also more weakly an antagonist of the μ-opioid receptor, with about 31-fold lower affinity and 27-fold lower inhibitory potency at the μ-opioid receptor relative to the κ-opioid receptor. CVL-354 is taken by mouth. It was originated by Pfizer and is under development by Cerevel Therapeutics. As of September 2022, CVL-354 is in phase 1 clinical trials for major depressive disorder and is in the preclincal stage of development for substance-related disorders.

See also 
 κ-Opioid receptor § Antagonists
 List of investigational antidepressants § κ-Opioid receptor antagonists

References 

Experimental drugs
Kappa-opioid receptor antagonists
Mu-opioid receptor antagonists
Synthetic opioids